The Kinabatangan supple skink (Lygosoma kinabatanganense) is a species of skink found in Malaysia.

References

Lygosoma
Reptiles described in 2018
Endemic fauna of Malaysia
Reptiles of Malaysia
Taxa named by Larry Lee Grismer
Taxa named by Evan Quah
Taxa named by Zaharil Duzulkafly
Taxa named by Paul Yambun
Reptiles of Borneo